HMS Shrewsbury was a three-decker 80-gun third-rate ship of the line of the Royal Navy, built by Joseph Allin the elder and launched at Portsmouth Dockyard on the 6th of February, 1695.

Shrewsbury narrowly escaped destruction on the Goodwin Sands during the Great Storm on the 26th of November 1703. She was rebuilt according to the 1706 Establishment at Deptford Dockyard, and was relaunched on the 12th of  August 1713.

The Shrewsbury was part of Vice-Admiral Edward Vernon's fleet and took part against the Spanish in the disastrous defeat expedition to Cartagena de Indias during the War of Jenkins' Ear.

Shrewsbury continued in service until 1749, when she was broken up.

Notes

References

Lavery, Brian (2003) The Ship of the Line – Volume 1: The development of the battlefleet 1650–1850. Conway Maritime Press. .

Ships of the line of the Royal Navy
1690s ships